Ó Rothláin is an Irish surname. The name is a Patronym meaning "descendant of Rothlán." It is suggested that it is a possible variant of Ó Raghalláin, or Ó Roghallaigh. It is the pre-anglicised, Irish form of the names Rowlan, Rowland, Rowlands, Rollan, Rollin, Rolan and Rowley. The name can also be found spelled as Ó Rothlán, Ó Rothlain, O'Rothlain, Rothlán, and Rothlan.

Overview 
The Ó Rothláin families have a strong link with County Mayo, and Country Sligo in the province of Connacht, and belong to the Uí Fiachrach. Historically, the family held the role of chieftain (titled as "Taoiseach").

History

Chieftains of the Principality of Coolcarney 
Dubhaltach Mac Fhirbhisigh states in a poem written in 1417 that, Coolcarney "embraced the territory between Beel Lasa (or Foxford) and the Brosnach river in Castleconnor." William Gregory Wood-Martin wrote that the family territory included Cluain na gCliabhrach (anglicised as Cloonagleavragh). Mac Fhirbhisigh describes "O'Rothlain the Ready" as one of four chieftains in Coolcarney and states that they were a "festive party." Of Coolcarney John O'Donovan stated:

"These are it's [sic] hereditary tribes, namely, O'Rothlain it's chieftain, and Ua Cuinn, Ua Iarnain, and Ua Finain."

References in Irish Annals and scholarly works 
Various members of the Ó Rothláin sept are recorded in The Tribes, Customs and Genealogies of the Hy Fiachrach by O'Donovan.

 The earliest reference is found in Irish Annals dating back to 1208.  According to the Annals of the Four Masters, Auliffe (also spelled "Awlave") O'Rothlain, Chief of Calry of Coolcarney, was slain by O'Moran.  
 The name Ó Rothláin appears again in the year 1337 in the Annals of Connacht (Annála Connacht),1337.9, stating that, "Master Ó Rothlain rested in Christ." This same event again appears in the Annals of the Four Masters, M1337.3, "The Master Professor Ó Rothlain died." 
 In 1340, during the reign of Edward III of England, it is stated that "O'Rothlain, chiefs of Coill Fothaidh, a district on the borders of Roscommon and Mayo; they are thus mentioned by O'Dugan: 'O'Rothlain of Coill Fothaidh let us not omit, Chief of the whitestoned goblets and spears.'"

See also
 1208 in Ireland
 1337 in Ireland
 Kingdoms of Ancient Ireland
 Provinces of Ireland
 Annals of the Four Masters
 Uí Fiachrach Aidhne
 History of Ireland

References

External links
 Annals of the Four Masters from NewAdvent.org
 Surnames from AskOxford.com
 Tribes & Customs of Hy Fiachrach from the Irish Genealogical Foundation
 The Annals of the Four Masters (see Annal M1208.10, and M1337.3)
 Annála Connacht (see Annal 1337.9)

Irish-language surnames
Surnames of Irish origin
Gaelic-Irish nations and dynasties
Diaspora studies